Murat Aslan (born December 13, 1986) is a Turkish volleyball player. He is playing for Galatasaray, in addition to 48 caps with the national team.

External links 
 Player profile at galatasaray.org

1986 births
Living people
Volleyball players from Istanbul
Turkish men's volleyball players
Fenerbahçe volleyballers
Galatasaray S.K. (men's volleyball) players